Cheltenham Saracens Football Club is a football club based in Cheltenham, England.

History
Cheltenham Saracens were established in 1964 as a multi-sports club, with the football team joining Division Five of the Cheltenham League. Following several promotions, the club joined Division One of the Hellenic League in 1986. After winning Division One in 1999–2000, they were promoted to the Premier Division. After finishing bottom of the Premier Division in 2001–02 the club were relegated to Division One West.

In 2010–11 Cheltenham finished third in Division One West, earning promotion to the Premier Division. However, they were relegated back to Division One West at the end of the 2014–15 season after finishing bottom of the Premier Division.

Honours
Hellenic League
Division One champions 1999–2000
Gloucestershire Primary Challenge Cup
Winners 1971–72
Gloucestershire Senior Amateur Cup
Winners 1991–92
Cheltenham Minor Charities Cup
Winners 2009–10

Records
Highest league position: 11th in Hellenic League Premier Division, 2012–13
Best FA Cup performance: First qualifying round, 2015–16
Best FA Vase performance: First round, 2012–13
Record attendance: 327 vs Harrow Hill, 31 August 2003

References

External links

Football clubs in England
Football clubs in Gloucestershire
Sport in Cheltenham
Association football clubs established in 1964
1964 establishments in England
Cheltenham Association Football League
Hellenic Football League